The Brown Bears men's lacrosse team represents Brown University in the National Collegiate Athletic Association (NCAA) Division I men's lacrosse. Brown competes in the Ivy League and plays its home games at Stevenson-Pincince Field in Providence, Rhode Island.

History
The Brown University men's lacrosse program was founded in 1926. Brown continued to compete in intercollegiate lacrosse until 1937 when the sport was discontinued. The lacrosse program resumed play in 1961 under head coach Cliff Stevenson. Since 1961, Brown has won 10 Ivy League championships (five outright titles, five shared) and has made 14 NCAA Men's Lacrosse Championship tournament appearances, including nine NCAA Quarterfinal appearances. In 1994, Brown became the first program from New England to play in the NCAA Final Four, a record that remained until the UMass made a Final Four appearance in 2006.

National awards
The Brown lacrosse program has garnered numerous national collegiate lacrosse awards. Darren Lowe '92 was named 1992 NCAA Division I Player of the Year, as well as 1992 Division I Attackman of the Year. Standout goalie Greg Cattrano, was named Division I Goalie of the Year.  In 2009, Jordan Burke became the Division I Goalie of the Year.  Brown has also had two coaches selected as Division I Coach of the Year: Dom Starsia in 1985 and 1991, and Peter Lasagna in 1994. In 2016 attackman Dylan Molloy received the Tewaaraton Trophy, the Jack Turnbull Award, and the Lt. Raymond Enners Award.

Ivy League awards
Brown has also won numerous Ivy League awards since All-Ivy teams were first selected in 1957. Since the award's inception in 1974, ten Brown Bears have been named Ivy League Player of the Year and four Bears have been named Men's Lacrosse Ivy League Rookie of the Year since the Rookie award was established in 1981.  Since 1957, three Bears have been chosen First Team All-Ivy three times (Darren Lowe 1990, '91, '92), (Bill Aliber 1981, '82, '83), (Thomas Muldoon 2008, '09, '10) while 14 Bears have been named First Team All-Ivy two times. Jordan Burke became the first player to win Ivy League Player of the Year in back to back years (2008, '09).

Season Results
The following is a list of Brown's results by season as an NCAA Division I program:

{| class="wikitable"

|- align="center"

†NCAA canceled 2020 collegiate activities due to the COVID-19 virus.

References

NCAA Division I men's lacrosse teams
Brown Bears men's lacrosse
1926 establishments in Rhode Island
Lacrosse clubs established in 1926